Paddy Henderson may refer to:

 Paddy Henderson (journalist), former Team GB athlete, BBC journalist 
 P Henderson & Company, a ship owning and management company
 Paddy Henderson (footballer) (born 1938), former Irish football player
 Paddy Henderson (charity organizer), co-founder of the Trussel Trust

See also
 Pat Henderson (hurler) (born 1943), Irish former player and manager
 Patrick Henderson (active from 1973), American gospel keyboard player, songwriter and producer